Rhynchohyalus natalensis, the glasshead barreleye, is a species of barreleye found in oceans around the world at depths from . This species grows to a length of  SL. It and the brownsnout spookfish are the only vertebrates known to employ mirrors, in addition to lenses, to focus the images in its eyes. This fish, apart from its fluid filled dome and its mirrors, has four eyes that can see in 360°.

References

Opisthoproctidae
Monotypic fish genera
Fish described in 1924